Polish Film Chronicle (1944–95) was a 10-minute-long newsreel shown in Polish cinemas prior to the main film. It continued the traditions of the pre-war Polish Telegraphic Agency, and in Communist Poland was often used as propaganda tool. The chronicle was for the first time presented in Polish cinemas on December 1, 1944. It was produced biweekly by Warsaw's Wytwornia Filmow Dokumentalnych i Fabularnych (Documentary and Feature Film Studio, WFDiF), with cooperation of Film Studio “Czolowka”.

The chronicle served as a propaganda tool of the government of the People's Republic of Poland. It presented current events, economy, sports  and culture news, commentaries and opinion journalism, also entertainment, like private life of Irena Szewińska. Usually one newsreel consisted of five parts, each describing a different topic. In some cases, such as official holiday (e.g. International Workers' Day), whole newsreel was dedicated to the events of this holiday. Apart from cinemas, the chronicle was also presented in the 1960s by the Polish Television. In few selected cases the chronicle presented news from outside of Poland, but this was rare, as it concentrated on domestic issues. 

First editor-in-chief of the Polish Film Chronicle was Jerzy Bossak, and among its speakers were such renowned actors, as Władysław Hańcza and Andrzej Łapicki. Among other personalities who cooperated with the chronicle were Andrzej Munk and Władysław Szpilman. Almost all newsreels are black and white, although already in the 1950s, first colour productions were made, with the Sovcolor technology. Among colour newsreels are those which describe events of special importance, such as 1952 construction of the Palace of Culture and Science in Warsaw, 1953 reconstruction of Warsaw Old Town, the 1000 years of Poland Parade (1966), or Mirosław Hermaszewski’s flight (1978).  

Polish Film Chronicle was cancelled at cinemas on January 1, 1995. Warsaw's Documentary and Feature Film Studio still exists, and continues to make newsreels.

Sources 
 Historia o historii, czyli Polska Kronika Filmowa. Polish Radio article about the chronicle. 28.01.2013

External links 
 1979 Polish Film Chronicle about winter of the century

Newsreels
Broadcasting in Poland
1944 establishments in Poland
1995 disestablishments in Europe
Short film series